Axinoptera infusata is a moth in the family Geometridae. It is found on Borneo.

References

Moths described in 1866
Eupitheciini
Moths of Indonesia